= Ramesh Patange =

Indian writer

Ramesh Raghunath Patange
- Born: 9 August 1944 (age 82); Maharashtra, India
- Education: University of Mumbai
- Occupations: Writer, editor, social activist
- Awards: Padma Shri (2023)

Ramesh Raghunath Patange (born 9 August 1944) is an Indian writer, editor, and social activist known for his work on social harmony, caste reform, constitutional awareness, and Marathi literature.

== Early life and education ==
Patange completed a Master of Arts degree from the University of Mumbai.

During the Emergency (1975–1977), he was detained under the Maintenance of Internal Security Act (MISA) and imprisoned in Thane Jail for approximately fourteen months.

== Career ==
Patange served as director of Udyog Krishi Vikas Mandal, an organisation focusing on youth entrepreneurship, before entering journalism.

He joined the Marathi weekly Vivek as co-editor in 1985 and later became its chief editor.

Patange is chairman of Hindustan Prakashan Sanstha, Mumbai, and co-founder of organisations such as Samajik Samarasata Munch and Bhatke Vimukta Vikas Parishad (Nomadic Tribes Development Council).

His work emphasises social reform, discourse on caste relations, constitutional values, and cultural understanding.

== Selected works ==
Patange has authored several books in Marathi and English on social reform, Dr. B. R. Ambedkar, constitutional studies, and social harmony. Selected works include:

- Me Manu Ani Sangh (autobiographical reflections)
- Angustan Te Lekhani
- Samarastecha Vatsaru

These works focus on caste relations, constitutional values, and questions of social integration within Indian society.

== Recognition ==
In 2023, Patange was conferred the Padma Shri by the Government of India in the field of Literature and Education. The award recognised his contributions as a writer and social activist.
